The 2013–14 Fordham Rams men's basketball team represented Fordham University during the 2013–14 NCAA Division I men's basketball season. The team was coached by Tom Pecora in his fourth year at the school. Fordham Rams home games were played at Rose Hill Gymnasium and the team are a member of the Atlantic 10 Conference. They finished the season 10–21, 2–14 in A-10 play to finish in last place. They advanced to the second round of the A-10 tournament where they lost to Dayton.

Roster

Schedule and results

|-
!colspan=9 style="background:#76032E; color:#FFFFFF;"| Exhibition

|-
!colspan=9 style="background:#76032E; color:#FFFFFF;"| Regular season

|-
!colspan=9 style="background:#76032E; color:#FFFFFF;"| Atlantic 10 tournament

References

Fordham
Fordham Rams men's basketball seasons